Stefanidis is a surname. Notable people with the surname include: 

Babis Stefanidis (born 1981), Greek–Swedish footballer and manager
Christoforos Stefanidis (born 1980), Greek basketball player
John Stefanidis, British interior designer
Markos Stefanidis (born 1967), Greek football manager
Miltos Stefanidis (born 1995), Greek footballer
Nestoras Stefanidis (born 1984), Greek footballer